Uliks Kotrri (born 21 June 1975) is an Albanian former professional footballer who played as a midfielder.

Club career
Kotrri was born in Shkodër. At club level, he played for hometown club Vllaznia Shkodër and abroad for Austria Klagenfurt, Energie Cottbus, Tavriya Simferopol, and Otago United.

International career
He made his debut for Albania in a January 1998 friendly match against Turkey and earned a total of 3 caps, scoring no goals. His final international was a February 1998 Malta Tournament match against Latvia.

Personal life
Kotrri now works as a FIFA agent.
His son Enea Uliks Kotrri has played for the Albania U-16 team and for Energie Cottbus academy.

References

External links

 

1975 births
Living people
Footballers from Shkodër
Albanian footballers
Association football midfielders
KF Vllaznia Shkodër players
FC Kärnten players
FC Energie Cottbus players
SC Tavriya Simferopol players
Southern United FC players
Kategoria Superiore players
Ukrainian Premier League players
Albania international footballers
Albanian expatriate footballers
Albanian expatriate sportspeople in Austria
Albanian expatriate sportspeople in Germany
Albanian expatriate sportspeople in Ukraine
Albanian expatriate sportspeople in New Zealand
Expatriate footballers in Austria
Expatriate footballers in Germany
Expatriate footballers in Ukraine
Expatriate association footballers in New Zealand